Sham Lal is a Pakistani politician who was elected member for the Provincial Assembly of Balochistan.

Political career
He was elected to Provincial Assembly of Balochistan on a reserved seat for minorities in 2018 Pakistani general election representing Muttahida Majlis-e-Amal

References

External links
Welcome to the Website of Provincial Assembly of Balochistan

Living people
Politicians from Balochistan, Pakistan
Muttahida Majlis-e-Amal MPAs (Balochistan)
Year of birth missing (living people)
Pakistani Hindus
Balochistan MPAs 2018–2023